John Roger Stephens (born December 28, 1978), known professionally as John Legend, is an American singer, songwriter, pianist, record producer and actor. He began his musical career by working behind the scenes, playing piano on Lauryn Hill's "Everything Is Everything", and making uncredited guest appearances on Jay-Z's "Encore" and Alicia Keys's "You Don't Know My Name". He then signed to Kanye West's GOOD Music and released his debut album Get Lifted (2004), which reached the top ten on the Billboard 200 and was certified double platinum by the Recording Industry Association of America.

Legend received nine nominations at the 48th Annual Grammy Awards, including nominations for the singles "So High" with Lauryn Hill and "Ordinary People", with the latter song winning for Best Male R&B Vocal Performance. The album also earned him awards for Best New Artist and Best R&B Album. His second studio album Once Again (2006), spawned the single "Save Room", and became his second top ten album on the Billboard 200 chart. The lead single from his third album Evolver (2008), "Green Light" featuring André 3000, reached the top 40 on the Billboard Hot 100 and was certified platinum by the RIAA. In June 2008, he released the live album John Legend: Live from Philadelphia.

Legend would later collaborate with The Roots on the album Wake Up! (2010). His fourth studio album, Love in the Future (2013), spawned the single "All of Me". The song peaked at number one on the Billboard Hot 100, and has attained Diamond status, being certified 14× platinum by the RIAA. In 2015, he was featured on the single "Like I'm Gonna Lose You" by Meghan Trainor, which reached the top ten in the U.S. Legend has since released the albums Darkness and Light (2016), A Legendary Christmas (2018). In 2020 Legend published his seventh studio album Bigger Love, which won the Grammy Award for Best R&B Album, and in 2022 the double album Legend.

In 2007, Legend received the Hal David Starlight Award from the Songwriters Hall of Fame. Legend won the Academy Award for Best Original Song and Golden Globe Award in 2015 for co-writing the song "Glory" from the film Selma. He has received a total of twelve Grammy Awards. In 2017, Legend won a Tony Award for co-producing Jitney for the Broadway stage. In 2018, Legend portrayed Jesus Christ in NBC's adaptation of the rock opera Jesus Christ Superstar. He received a Primetime Emmy Award nomination for his acting role, and won for his role as a producer of the show, making him the first black man and second youngest person to have won all four of the major American entertainment awards: Emmy, Grammy, Oscar, and Tony (EGOT). Legend is also the recipient of the NAACP's President's Award. From 2019 to 2022, Legend was featured as a coach on The Voice.

Early life
John Roger Stephens was born on December 28, 1978, in Springfield, Ohio. He is the eldest of four children of Phyllis Elaine (née Lloyd), a seamstress, and Ronald Lamar Stephens, a factory worker at International Harvester (which also has a factory in Springfield, Ohio and is now Navistar). His father was a drummer, while "his mother sang and directed the church choir, and his grandmother was the church organist." In 2004, Legend stated that his parents were divorced for 12 years before reuniting. Legend was homeschooled by his mother. He began playing the piano at age 4. At the age of 7, he performed with his church choir. Because of his academic talent, he skipped two grades.

At the age of 12, Legend attended North High School in Springfield, Ohio, from which he graduated as salutatorian of his class four years later. At the age of 15, Legend won a Black History Month essay competition run by McDonald's, following the prompt "How do you intend to make Black history?" with an essay about how he intended to be a successful musician, according to an interview on the Carlos Watson Show. Legend was offered admission to Harvard University and scholarships to Georgetown University and Morehouse College; he ultimately decided to attend the University of Pennsylvania.

At college, Legend served as the president and musical director of the co-ed jazz and pop a cappella group the Counterparts. His lead vocals on the group's recording of Joan Osborne's "One of Us" (written by fellow Penn alum Eric Bazilian of the Hooters) received critical acclaim, landing the song on the track list of the 1998 Best of Collegiate a Cappella compilation CD. Legend was also a member of the Sphinx Senior Society and Onyx Senior Honor Society. While in college, Legend was introduced to Lauryn Hill by a friend. Hill hired him to play piano on "Everything Is Everything", a song from her album The Miseducation of Lauryn Hill. He graduated magna cum laude with a bachelor's degree in English with an emphasis on African-American literature  in 1999.

Career

Career beginnings
After graduating from college, Legend worked as a management consultant at the Boston Consulting Group (BCG) and began producing, writing, and recording his own music. He released two albums independently: his self-titled demo (2000) and Live at Jimmy's Uptown (2001), which he sold at his shows. He subsequently began working on his demo and began sending his work to various record labels.

In 2001, Devo Springsteen introduced Legend to Kanye West, then an up-and-coming hip-hop artist; Legend was hired to sing during the hooks of West's music. After signing to West's label, he chose his stage name from an idea that was given to him by poet J. Ivy, due to what he perceived as an "old-school sound". J. Ivy stated, "I heard your music and it reminds me of that music from the old school. You sound like one of the legends. As a matter of fact, that's what I'm going to call you from now on! I'm going to call you John Legend." After J. Ivy continued to call him by the new moniker "John Legend", others quickly caught on, including Kanye West. Despite Stephens' reluctance to adopt a stage name, he eventually announced his new artist name as John Legend.

2004–2007: Breakthrough success
Legend released his debut album, Get Lifted, on GOOD Music in December 2004. It featured production by Kanye West, Dave Tozer, and will.i.am, and debuted at number 7 on the US Billboard 200, selling 116,000 copies in its first week. It went on to sell 540,300 copies in the United States and was certified gold by the RIAA. An international success, Get Lifted also reached number one on the Norwegian Albums Chart and peaked within the top ten in the Netherlands and Sweden, resulting in worldwide sales of 850,000 copies. Critically acclaimed, it won the 2006 Grammy Award for Best R&B Album, and earned Legend another two nominal awards for Best New Artist and Best Male R&B Vocal Performance. Altogether, the album produced four singles, including debut single "Used to Love U", which entered the top 30 of the New Zealand and UK Singles Chart, and Grammy Award-winning "Ordinary People" which peaked at 24 on the Billboard Hot 100. Legend also co-wrote Janet Jackson's "I Want You", which was certified platinum and received a nomination for Best Female R&B Vocal Performance at the 47th Annual Grammy Awards.

A highly sought after collaborator, Legend was featured on several records in the following years. He appeared on albums by Fort Minor, Sérgio Mendes, Jay-Z, Mary J. Blige, the Black Eyed Peas, Stephen Colbert, Rich Boy, J'Dillian MSTRKRFT, Chemistry, and Fergie, among others. Legend also tentatively worked with Michael Jackson on a future album for which he had written one song. In August 2006, Legend appeared in an episode of Sesame Street. He performed a song entitled "It Feels Good When You Sing a Song", a duet with Hoots the Owl. He also performed during the pregame show of Super Bowl XL in Detroit and the halftime show at the 2006 NBA All-Star Game.

In October 2006, Legend's second album, Once Again, was released. Legend co-wrote and co-produced the bulk of the album, which saw him reteaming with West and will.i.am but also spawned production from Raphael Saadiq, Craig Street, Sa-Ra, Eric Hudson, Devo Springsteen, Dave Tozer and Avenue. Released to major commercial success, it reached number three on the Billboard 200 and debuted on top of the Top R&B/Hip-Hop Albums chart. It was eventually certified platinum by the RIAA, and reached gold status in Italy, the Netherlands, and the United Kingdom. At the 2007 Grammy Awards ceremony, the song "Heaven" was awarded the Grammy Award for Best Male R&B Vocal Performance, while lead single "Save Room" received a nod in the Best Male Pop Vocal category. Legend won a second Grammy that year for "Family Affair", a collaboration with Sly & the Family Stone, Joss Stone and Van Hunt, for the former's Different Strokes by Different Folks album.

2008–2010: Rising popularity

In January 2008, Legend sang in a video for Barack Obama, produced by will.i.am called "Yes We Can". The same year, Legend had a supporting, singing-only role in the 2008 movie Soul Men, where he plays the deceased lead singer of a fictitious soul group that includes Samuel L. Jackson and Bernie Mac. In October, he released his third studio album, Evolver. Speaking about the reasons for calling the album Evolver, he stated: "I think people sometimes come to expect certain things from certain artists. They expect you to kind of stay in the same place you were at when you started out. Whereas I feel I want my career to be defined by the fact that I'm NOT gonna stay in the same place, and that I'm always gonna try new things and experiment. So, as I think this album represents a manifestation of that, I came up with the title 'Evolver'." The album was preceded by dance-pop-influenced uptempo single "Green Light" which featured rapper Andre 3000 of OutKast and became his highest-charting single since "Ordinary People"; it was also nominated for the Grammy Award for Best Rap/Sung Collaboration. On March 30, 2008, Legend performed "America the Beautiful" in front of a sold-out crowd of 74,635 in the Orlando Citrus Bowl, now known as Camping World Stadium, for WWE's WrestleMania XXIV.

In 2009, Legend performed in The People Speak, a documentary feature film that uses dramatic and musical performances of the letters, diaries, and speeches of everyday Americans, based on historian Howard Zinn's A People's History of the United States. Also in 2009, Legend and the Roots teamed up to record a collaborative album, Wake Up!, which was released on September 21, 2010. The first single released from the album was "Wake Up Everybody" featuring singer Melanie Fiona and rapper Common. In November 2010, Legend was featured on West's My Beautiful Dark Twisted Fantasy album, listed a feature on the song 'Blame Game'. In February 2011, Legend won three prizes at the 53rd Annual Grammy Music Awards. He was awarded Best R&B Song for "Shine", while he and the Roots won Grammy Awards for Best R&B Album and Best Traditional R&B Vocal Performance for "Hang On in There". In March 2011, Legend and the Roots won two NAACP Image Awards – one for Outstanding Album (Wake Up!) and one for Outstanding Duo, Group or Collaboration.

2011–2015: Touring years
On July 5, 2011, songwriter Anthony Stokes filed a copyright infringement lawsuit against Legend in United States District Court in the District of New Jersey, alleging that Legend's song "Maxine's Interlude" from his 2006 album Once Again derives from Stokes' demo "Where Are You Now". Stokes claimed he gave Legend a demo of the song in 2004 following a concert at the University of North Carolina at Chapel Hill. Legend denied the allegations, telling E! Online, "I never heard of his song until he sued me. I would never steal anyone's song. We will fight it in court and we will prevail." However, nearly 60,000 people took a TMZ.com poll that compared the two songs and 65% of voters believed that Legend's "Maxine's Interlude" is a rip-off of Stokes' "Where Are You Now". A year later, Legend confirmed that he settled out of court with Stokes for an undisclosed amount.

Also in 2011, Legend completed a 50-date tour as a guest for British soul band Sade. In the San Diego stop, Legend confirmed that he was working on his next studio album and played a new song called "Dreams". Later, via his official website, he revealed the official title of the album to be Love in the Future, and debuted part of a new track called "Caught Up". The album has been executive-produced by Legend himself, along with Kanye West and Dave Tozer – the same team who worked on Legend's previous albums Get Lifted, Once Again, and Evolver. Legend has stated that his intention for the record was "To make a modern soul album – to flip that classic feel into a modern context."

Legend was granted an Honorary Doctorate Degree from Howard University at the 144th Commencement Exercises on Saturday, May 12, 2012. Legend was a judge on the ABC music show Duets along with Kelly Clarkson, Jennifer Nettles, and Robin Thicke. Legend's spot was originally for Lionel Richie, who had to leave the show due to a scheduling conflict. Duets debuted on Thursday, May 24, 2012.

He released his fourth studio album, Love in the Future, on September 3, 2013, debuting number 4 on the Billboard 200, selling 68,000 copies in its first week. The album was nominated for Best R&B album at the 2014 Grammy Awards. Legend's third single from the album, "All of Me", became an international chart success, peaking at number one on the Billboard Hot 100 for three consecutive weeks and reaching the top of six national charts and the top ten in numerous other countries, becoming one of the best-selling digital singles of all time. It was ranked the third best-selling song in the United States and the United Kingdom during 2014. The song is a ballad dedicated to his wife, Chrissy Teigen, and was performed at the 56th Annual Grammy Awards.

In 2014, Legend partnered with the rapper Common to write the song "Glory", featured in the film Selma, which chronicled the 1965 Selma to Montgomery marches. The song won the Golden Globe Award for Best Original Song as well as the Academy Award for Best Original Song. Legend and Common performed "Glory" at the 87th Academy Awards on February 22, 2015.

Legend was featured on Meghan Trainor's "Like I'm Gonna Lose You" from her debut studio album, which reached number eight on the Billboard Hot 100. On February 1, 2015, he sang "America the Beautiful" in the opening ceremony of Super Bowl XLIX. He provided guest vocals on Kelly Clarkson's song "Run Run Run" for her album Piece by Piece. He also co-wrote and provided vocals for French DJ David Guetta's song "Listen", as part of the album Listen.

2016–present: International recognition and resurgence
Legend released his new album Darkness and Light, with first single "Love Me Now", on December 2, 2016, with songs featuring Chance the Rapper and Miguel. Legend featured on Kygo's song "Happy Birthday" for his debut studio album "Cloud Nine" released in 2016.

For the 2017 film Beauty and the Beast, Legend and Ariana Grande performed a duet on the title track, a remake of the 1991 original version sung by Celine Dion and Peabo Bryson. In April 2017, Crow: The Legend, a short animation film, premiered its prologue at the Tribeca Film Festival. Legend was cast in the title role as the character Crow. He also served as executive producer for the project and performed the original song "When You Can Fly". The film won at thirteen different film festivals including the LA Film Festival where it made its North American premiere in 2018. The film won Best Animation VR Experience at the 2018 Raindance Film Festival and received nomination for Best Virtual Reality Production at the 46th Annual Annie Awards.

On December 19, 2017, NBC announced that Legend had been cast in the title role in the live concert production of Jesus Christ Superstar at the Marcy Avenue Armory in Williamsburg, Brooklyn. The production was broadcast live on NBC television on April 1, 2018 (the date of Easter Sunday that year in Western Christianity). On May 8, 2018, Google chose Legend as one of the six new Google Assistant voices.

Legend was one of the few celebrities to appear and speak out in the Lifetime documentary Surviving R. Kelly. The six-part docuseries details sex abuse allegations spread over four decades against acclaimed R&B singer R. Kelly. It focuses on women who allege that the musician and record producer used his status and influence to sexually and physically abuse women and young girls for decades. Legend lambasted R. Kelly during his interview in the final episode of the series, asserting that "R. Kelly has brought so much pain to so many people. Time's up for R. Kelly."

Despite countless public allegations and controversies concerning Kelly, Legend stands as the only major recording artist willing to come forward and speak against him in the documentary. In response to fans who labeled him as "brave" for his actions, Legend stated the following on Twitter ahead of the program's debut: "To everyone telling me how courageous I am for appearing in the doc, it didn't feel risky at all. I believe these women and don't give a fuck about protecting a serial child rapist. Easy decision." Executive producer Dream Hampton revealed that it was "incredibly difficult" to get men and women who had artistically collaborated with Kelly to come forward, including those who had criticized him. During an interview with Detroit Free Press she said, "We asked Lady Gaga. We asked Erykah Badu. We asked Céline Dion. We asked Jay-Z. We asked Dave Chappelle. [They're] people who have been critical of him. That makes John Legend even more of a hero for me."

On May 21, 2019, Legend was the winning coach on The Voice and won the competition with his artist Maelyn Jarmon. In November, Legend was named People Sexiest Man Alive. In 2020, Legend was working on a seventh album. On May 13, 2020, he announced the album would be titled Bigger Love. It was released on June 19. On May 28, 2020, Legend received an honorary doctorate from Berklee College of Music. Legend is featured on Carrie Underwood's Christmas album My Gift. Legend wrote his featured track entitled Hallelujah. Legend was among the performers in the Celebrating America television event held on Inauguration Day 2021. He delivered the commencement address to the Duke University Class of 2021. On November 12, 2021, Legend signed with Republic Records after completing the contract that lasted for 17 years with Sony Music.

In February 2022 John Legend has launched a music-based NFT platform called ‘OurSong'. On April 3, 2022, performed a new song called "Free" at the 64th Annual Grammy Awards as a tribute to the fallen citizens of Ukraine amid Russo-Ukrainian War. He was joined on stage alongside by three Ukrainian female artists Siuzanna Iglidan, Mika Newtown, and poet Lyuba Yakimchuk. On September 9, 2022, he released his eighth studio album titled Legend.

Philanthropy
Legend performed a benefit concert in Springfield, Ohio in 2005 in support of a tax levy for the Springfield City School District.

In May 2007, Legend partnered with Tide laundry detergent to raise awareness about the need of families in St. Bernard Parish (Chalmette, Louisiana), one of the areas most devastated by Hurricane Katrina; he spent a day folding laundry at the Tide "clean start" mobile laundromat and visited homes that Tide was helping to rebuild in that community. On July 7, 2007, Legend participated in the Live Earth concert in London, performing "Ordinary People". After reading Professor Jeffrey Sachs' book The End of Poverty, Legend started his Show Me Campaign in 2007. In this campaign, Legend called on his fans to help him in his initiative for residents in Bosaso Village, Somalia and non-profit organizations partnered with the campaign.

In early 2008, he began touring with Alexus Ruffin and Professor Jeff Sachs of Columbia University's Earth Institute to promote sustainable development as an achievable goal. Legend joined Sachs as a keynote speaker and performer at the inaugural Millennium Campus Conference. Legend then joined the Board of Advisors of the Millennium Campus Network (MCN), and has aided MCN programs through online support and funding fellowships for MCN summer interns through the Show Me Campaign. In 2009, Legend gave AIDS Service Center NYC permission to remix his song "If You're Out There" to create a music video promoting HIV/AIDS awareness and testing.

On January 22, 2010, he performed "Sometimes I Feel Like a Motherless Child" on the Hope for Haiti Now telethon show. On September 8, 2010, John Legend joined the national board of Teach For America. Legend also sits on the boards of the Education Equality Project, the Harlem Village Academies, and Stand for Children. He serves on the Harlem Village Academies' National Leadership Board. On September 9, 2010, he performed "Coming Home" on the Colbert Report as a tribute song for the end of combat operations in Iraq, and for the active troops and the veterans of the United States Armed Forces. In 2011, he contributed the track "Love I've Never Known" to the Red Hot Organization's most recent album Red Hot+Rio 2. The album is a follow-up to the 1996 Red Hot+Rio. Proceeds from the album sales were donated to raise awareness and money to fight AIDS/HIV and related health and social issues. On March 6, 2012, John Legend was appointed by the World Economic Forum to the Forum of Young Global Leaders. Later that year, Legend stopped by Children's Hospital Los Angeles for a surprise visit and acoustic performance as a part of Get Well Soon Tour. On June 1, 2013, Legend performed at Gucci's global concert event in London whose campaign, "Chime for Change", aims to raise awareness of women's issues in education, health and justice. At a press conference before his performance, Legend identified himself as a feminist saying, "All men should be feminists. If men care about women's rights the world will be a better place."

In 2014, Legend founded the FREEAMERICA campaign, which aims to help reform incarceration in the United States. He also supported the 2018 ballot initiative to pass Florida Amendment 4, which restored the voting rights of Floridians with felony convictions.

In 2016, Legend co-signed a letter to the United Nations Secretary-General Ban Ki-Moon calling for a more humane drug policy, along with people such as Richard Branson, Jane Fonda, and George Shultz. The following year, Legend appeared on Salem State University's speaker series and was recognized by Voices Against Injustice (formerly known as the Salem Award Foundation for Human Rights and Social Justice) as the inaugural Salem Advocate for Social Justice. Also in 2017 Legend donated $500,000 to Springfield City School District to renovate an auditorium, which is named in his honor, within the Springfield Center of Innovation. He performed at the John Legend Theater on October 9, 2016. In 2018, he starred in an animated virtual-reality short film written and directed by Eric Darnell, titled Crow: The Legend, together with Oprah Winfrey, telling a Native American origin tale.

Personal life
Legend met model Chrissy Teigen in 2006 while filming the music video for his song "Stereo". They became engaged in December 2011 and were married on September 14, 2013, in Como, Italy. His 2013 song "All of Me" is dedicated to her. The couple has three children: a daughter born in April 2016, a son born in May 2018, and a daughter born in January 2023. Their children were all conceived via in vitro fertilization.

In 2020, their third child, was lost at twenty weeks due to a pregnancy complication. The pregnancy loss was described by media as a late miscarriage; in 2022, Teigen clarified that the loss was "an abortion to save my life for a baby that had absolutely no chance."

On the PBS series Finding Your Roots, it was determined that Legend's genetic makeup is 64% African, 32% European, and 4% Native American.

Discography

Studio albums
 Get Lifted (2004)
 Once Again (2006)
 Evolver (2008)
 Love in the Future (2013)
 Darkness and Light (2016)
 A Legendary Christmas (2018)
 Bigger Love (2020)
  Legend (2022)

Collaborative studio albums
 Wake Up! with the Roots (2010)

Tours
Get Lifted Tour (2005)
Once Again Tour (2007)
Evolver Tour (2009)
Love in the Future World Tour (2014)
Darkness and Light World Tour (2017)
A Legendary Christmas tour (2018-19)
Bigger Love Tour (2021)

Filmography

John is a partner in Get Lifted Film Co. alongside Mike Jackson & Ty Stiklorius. He served as an Executive Producer for Giving Voice, Jingle Jangle: A Christmas Journey, Atlanta’s Missing And Murdered: The Lost Children, Sherman’s Showcase And Sherman’s Showcase: Black History Month Spectacular, Rhythm + Flow And La La Land.

Television

Film

Awards and nominations

References

External links

 
 
 
 

 
1978 births
Living people
21st-century African-American male singers
21st-century American singers
African-American feminists
African-American film score composers
African-American male singer-songwriters
African-American pianists
African-American record producers
African-American television personalities
American baritones
American contemporary R&B singers
American hip hop singers
American male pianists
American male pop singers
American male television actors
American male voice actors
American management consultants
American multi-instrumentalists
American neo soul singers
American pop pianists
American soul musicians
Audiobook narrators
Best Original Song Academy Award-winning songwriters
Boston Consulting Group people
California Democrats
Columbia Records artists
Daytime Emmy Award winners
Electropop musicians
Feminist musicians
Golden Globe Award-winning musicians
GOOD Music artists
Grammy Award winners
Judges in American reality television series
Male actors from Ohio
Male feminists
Midwest hip hop musicians
Musicians from Springfield, Ohio
Ohio Democrats
Philanthropists from Ohio
Primetime Emmy Award winners
Record producers from Ohio
Singer-songwriters from Ohio
Sony Music artists
Tony Award winners